Joshua Scott McRoberts (born February 28, 1987) is an American former professional basketball player who played eleven seasons in the National Basketball Association (NBA). McRoberts, a  power forward, played college basketball for the Duke Blue Devils. He was selected by the Portland Trail Blazers with the 37th overall pick in the 2007 NBA draft.

High school career
McRoberts attended Carmel High School in Carmel, Indiana and led the Greyhounds in both scoring and rebounding during his senior year. According to the Carmel Monthly magazine, McRoberts became an assistant coach for the Carmel High School's varsity basketball team during the 2020-2021 season. 

He averaged 17.9 points to go along with 11.4 rebounds, 4.2 assists and 3.0 blocked shots per game and shot .593 (166-of-280) from the field while guiding the Greyhounds to a 21–4 record and a trip to the sectional championship game in 2005. McRoberts was considered the number one power forward prospect out of high school, and was projected to be drafted in the 2005 NBA draft had he declared. 

As of 2021, 247sports.org rates McRoberts as the 3rd highest rated recruit in the history of Duke basketball.

College career

Freshman season
At Duke University, McRoberts averaged 8.7 points and 1.3 blocked shots while leading the team (60.5%) in field goal percentage. McRoberts was named to the ACC All-Freshman team. He helped the Duke Blue Devils to a record of 32–4, the ACC regular season title, and the 2006 ACC tournament championship title by defeating the Boston College Eagles. He was also named to the third team Freshman All-America by collegehoops.net.

McRoberts' late-season numbers improved as he recorded 10 of his 15 double-figure scoring games in his final 14 games, while averaging 10.4 points and 6.3 rebounds (with a 59.6 FG%).

Considered a potential NBA draft lottery pick, McRoberts instead stated he would not enter the draft, and would return to Duke for the 2006–2007 season.

McRoberts underwent a successful lumbar discectomy on August 3, 2006. He had been suffering from chronic back problems since high school and had the operation to alleviate the problem.

Sophomore season
On December 19, 2006 against Kent State, McRoberts had a career-high 19 points, six blocks, six rebounds, four assists, and four steals making him the first Duke player to tally at least four in all five categories.

Professional career

Portland Trail Blazers (2007–2008)
On March 22, 2007, McRoberts declared himself eligible for the 2007 NBA draft. On June 28, 2007, he was selected by the Portland Trail Blazers with the 37th overall pick in the NBA draft.

On January 9, 2008, McRoberts was assigned to the Idaho Stampede, the Trail Blazers' D-League affiliate. After being with the Stampede for nearly a month, and getting an over 20-minute per game increase in playing time, McRoberts was called back up to the Trail Blazers.

Indiana Pacers (2008–2011)
On June 26, 2008, the night of the 2008 NBA draft, McRoberts was traded by the Trail Blazers to his hometown Indiana Pacers in a deal that sent him along with Brandon Rush and Jarrett Jack in return for 11th overall pick Jerryd Bayless and Ike Diogu.

Los Angeles Lakers (2011–2012)
On December 14, 2011, the Los Angeles Lakers signed McRoberts to a two-year deal worth about $6 million.

Orlando Magic (2012–2013)

On August 10, 2012, McRoberts was traded to the Orlando Magic as part of the blockbuster deal that sent All-Star center Dwight Howard to the Lakers.

Charlotte Bobcats (2013–2014)
On February 21, 2013, McRoberts was traded to the Charlotte Bobcats for Hakim Warrick.

On July 11, 2013, McRoberts re-signed with the Bobcats. On March 28, 2014, McRoberts scored a career high 24 points in a loss to the Orlando Magic. He finished the season with career highs in games played and starts with 78 each. On April 30, 2014, McRoberts underwent successful surgery to remove bone spurs from his left big toe.

On June 18, 2014, McRoberts opted out of his 2014–15 contract with the Charlotte Hornets.

Miami Heat (2014–2017)
On July 14, 2014, McRoberts signed with the Miami Heat to a reported four-year, $23 million contract. After tearing his right meniscus on December 9, 2014 against the Phoenix Suns, McRoberts underwent surgery to repair it on December 22 and was subsequently ruled out for the rest of the 2014–15 season; he appeared in just 17 games.

After having most of 2014–15 season wiped out by injuries, McRoberts lost his starting spot because of Hassan Whiteside's emergence. He came into the 2015–16 season with a significant role off the bench, but that got away from him after missing nearly two months with a bruised knee.

On December 27, 2016, McRoberts was ruled out indefinitely with a stress fracture in his problematic left foot.

On May 23, 2017, McRoberts opted into his final year of his contract worth just over $6 million.

Dallas Mavericks (2017–2018)
On July 7, 2017, McRoberts was traded, along with a 2023 second round draft pick and cash considerations, to the Dallas Mavericks in exchange for A. J. Hammons. On February 10, 2018, he was waived by the Mavericks. He saw action in two games for the Mavericks after spending the first 37 games of the season on the inactive list while rehabbing a left foot injury.

Player profile
McRoberts can play both power forward and center. His scoring mostly comes off fast breaks, rebounds and hustle plays. He is a screen-setter with a decent jumper, and possesses excellent passing skills for a big man. He is considered an average defender. Pau Gasol called McRoberts "scrappy and a hustler".

Awards

High school
 2005 McDonald's All-American Player of the Year
 2005 McDonald's All-American Game MVP
 2005 McDonald's All-American
 2005 First-team Parade All-American
 2005 National High School Coaches Assn. Senior Athlete of the Year

College
 2006 ACC All-Tournament Second Team
 2006 ACC All-Freshman Team
 2006 Third Team Freshman All-America
 2007 Atlantic Coast Sports Media Assocn All-ACC Second Team
 2007 ACC All-Defensive Team

NBA career statistics

Regular season

|-
| style="text-align:left;"|
| style="text-align:left;"|Portland
| 8 || 0 || 3.5 || .600 || .000 ||  || 1.3 || .3 || .1 || .0 || 1.5
|-
| style="text-align:left;"|
| style="text-align:left;"|Indiana
| 33 || 0 || 8.5 || .422 || .000 || .769 || 2.2 || .5 || .4 || .5 || 2.4
|-
| style="text-align:left;"|
| style="text-align:left;"|Indiana
| 42 || 3 || 12.5 || .521 || .348 || .500 || 3.0 || 1.0 || .4 || .4 || 4.3
|-
| style="text-align:left;"|
| style="text-align:left;"|Indiana
| 72 || 51 || 22.2 || .547 || .383 || .739 || 5.3 || 2.1 || .7 || .8 || 7.4
|-
| style="text-align:left;"|
| style="text-align:left;"|L.A. Lakers
| 50 || 6 || 14.4 || .475 || .429 || .639 || 3.4 || 1.0 || .3 || .4 || 2.8
|-
| style="text-align:left;"|
| style="text-align:left;"|Orlando
| 41 || 3 || 16.7 || .392 || .309 || .733 || 3.3 || 1.7 || .2 || .3 || 3.9
|-
| style="text-align:left;"|
| style="text-align:left;"|Charlotte
| 26 || 19 || 30.8 || .505 || .241 || .782 || 7.2 || 2.7 || .8 || .6 || 9.3
|-
| style="text-align:left;"|
| style="text-align:left;"|Charlotte
| 78 || 78 || 30.3 || .436 || .361 || .729 || 4.8 || 4.3 || .7 || .6 || 8.5
|-
| style="text-align:left;"|
| style="text-align:left;"|Miami
| 17 || 4 || 17.4 || .528 || .421 || .615 || 2.6 || 1.9 || .7 || .2 || 4.2
|-
| style="text-align:left;"|
| style="text-align:left;"|Miami
| 42 || 1 || 14.2 || .372 || .245 || .700 || 2.5 || 1.9 || .4 || .2 || 3.6
|-
| style="text-align:left;"|
| style="text-align:left;"|Miami
| 22 || 14 || 17.3 || .373 || .419 || .667 || 3.4 || 2.3 || .5 || .2 || 4.9
|-
| style="text-align:left;"|
| style="text-align:left;"|Dallas
| 2 || 0 || 3.0 || .000 || .000 ||  || .0 || .0 || .0 || .0 || .0
|- class"sortbottom"
| style="text-align:center;" colspan="2"|Career
| 433 || 179 || 19.1 || .463 || .340 || .705 || 3.9 || 2.1 || .5 || .4 || 5.4

Playoffs

|-
| style="text-align:left;"|2011
| style="text-align:left;"|Indiana
| 5 || 0 || 15.8 || .333 || .000 || .818 || 3.6 || 1.2 || .8 || .2 || 5.0
|-
| style="text-align:left;"|2012
| style="text-align:left;"|L.A. Lakers
| 6 || 0 || 2.7 || .250 || .000 ||  || .7 || .2 || .0 || .2 || .3
|-
| style="text-align:left;"|2014
| style="text-align:left;"|Charlotte
| 4 || 4 || 38.5 || .455 || .471 || .800 || 6.8 || 3.8 || 1.0 || .3 || 11.5
|-
| style="text-align:left;"|2016
| style="text-align:left;"|Miami
| 10 || 0 || 13.4 || .471 || .000 || 1.000 || 2.6 || .9 || .5 || .5 || 3.8
|- class"sortbottom"
| style="text-align:center;" colspan="2"|Career
| 25 || 4 || 15.3 || .421 || .308 || .852 || 3.0 || 1.2 || .5 || .3 || 4.4

References

External links

 ESPN.com profile

1987 births
Living people
American men's basketball players
Basketball players from Indianapolis
Carmel High School (Indiana) alumni
Charlotte Bobcats players
Dallas Mavericks players
Duke Blue Devils men's basketball players
Idaho Stampede players
Indiana Pacers players
Los Angeles Lakers players
McDonald's High School All-Americans
Miami Heat players
Orlando Magic players
Parade High School All-Americans (boys' basketball)
People from Carmel, Indiana
Portland Trail Blazers draft picks
Portland Trail Blazers players
Power forwards (basketball)